Massillon is a city in Stark County, Ohio, United States, approximately  west of Canton,  south of Akron, and  south of Cleveland. The population was 32,146 at the 2020 census. Massillon is the second city within the Canton–Massillon metropolitan area, which includes all of Stark and Carroll counties and had a population of 401,574 in 2020.

History

19th century

The original settlement of Kendal was founded in 1812 by Thomas Rotch, a Quaker originally of New Bedford, Massachusetts, and Hartford, Connecticut. James Duncan of New Hampshire first settled in Kendal before recording the plot for Massillon on December 6, 1826. Duncan, known as the city's founder, named the town after Jean Baptiste Massillon, a French Catholic bishop, at the request of his wife.  The town plat was established along the east bank of the Tuscarawas River, which was the surveyed route for the Ohio and Erie Canal being constructed to connect Lake Erie with the Ohio River. The canal section spanning from Cleveland to Massillon was completed in 1828. Among the leading merchants were the Wellman brothers Hiram and Marshall. Marshall Wellman was the grandfather of the American author Jack London. Massillon quickly became a major port town along the canal route, known as the Port of Massillon, following the canal's completion in the 1832. The first telegraph lines would reach Massillon in 1847, and the Ohio & Pennsylvania Railroad would extend its rails to Massillon in 1852. Massillon incorporated as a village in 1853. In 1868, Massillon incorporated as a city when the populated reached 5,000.

The Ohio Women's Convention met at Massillon on May 27, 1852. The president of the convention was Hannah Tracy Cutler. The meeting was held in Massillon Baptist Chapel. Attendees voted to establish the Ohio Women's Rights Association (OWRA), which held its first meeting the following year in Ravenna.

The C. M. Russell & Company, formed in 1848 by Charles. M. Russell and his brothers, Nahum Russell and Clement Russell, manufactured threshing machines and other agricultural implements in Massillon. The company began producing train cars in 1852 and incorporated in 1864 as Russell & Company Inc. In 1884, Russell & Company began producing its famed steam traction engines and quickly became one of the largest producers of industrial and agricultural equipment.  A merger with the Griscom-Spencer company in 1912 created the Griscom-Russell Company. Griscom-Russell produced heat exchangers for the United States Navy during World War II.  The company closed in 1962.

The Massillon Iron Bridge Company was founded by Joseph Davenport in 1869  after moving to Massillon from Boston to work at the C. M. Russell & Company. Davenport also invented and built the first locomotive "cowcatcher" and cab in Massillon. The company incorporated in 1887 as The Massillon Bridge Company. The Massillon Bridge Company designed and built steel truss bridges up through the mid-1900s, many of which stand today.

The Massillon State Hospital for the Insane opened in 1898  on 240 acres of land given to the state of Ohio for the purpose of constructing the hospital. The hospital was established by Ohio governor William McKinley. By 1950 there were 3,100 patients in the hospital.  Today it is known as Heartland Behavioral Healthcare.

20th century
The Forest City Motor Company was founded in Cleveland in 1906 but relocated to Massillon that same year. Forest City produced approximately 1,000 of their Jewel automobiles in Massillon between 1906 and 1909. The name of the company was changed to the Jewel Motor Car Company but the company eventually ceased production in 1909.

Although steelmaking and fabrication is found throughout its history, some say Massillon's steel age didn't start until 1909, when the first sheet of steel was rolled at the Massillon Rolling Mill Company. Massillon Rolling merged into the Central Steel Company in 1914, and lit its first open hearth furnace in 1915. Central Steel eventually became known as the Central Alloy Steel Company. In April 1930, Central Alloy merged with Republic Steel, becoming the third largest steel company in the world, with its Massillon operations employing nearly one-half of the city's workforce by 1959.  This included other Massillon divisions like Massillon Union Drawn Steel and its stainless steel division Enduro Stainless.  In 1984 Republic Steel was purchased by LTV Steel.  Enduro closed in 1985, and it and other stainless plants went through several ownership changes over the following 15 years.  The main Republic facilities on the southwest side of Massillon closed by 2002.

Stanley Macomber designed the open-web steel joist in 1921 while working for Massillon's Central Steel Company. Macomber left Central Steel and founded the Massillon Steel Joist Co. in 1923. His open-web steel joist, patented in 1924, was known as the Massillon Steel Joist. Macomber's invention was a revolutionary assembly of steel joists with a top slab used to support of floors, ceilings and roofs. The basis of Macomber's steel joist design is still used today. Stanley Macomber was inducted into the Inventors Hall of Fame in 2011.

Lincoln Highway, the first U.S. highway to run from coast to coast, was envisioned in 1913  and followed Main Street through the center of Massillon.  Main Street was eventually renamed Lincoln Way in recognition of the new highway. In 1928, the federal government renamed Lincoln Highway to U.S. 30. A controlled access freeway was constructed in 1971, bypassing U.S. 30 around to the city's most southern part. The old Lincoln Highway that runs through Massillon and Canton was reassigned as State Route 172.

Massillon was a site where one of the most tragic instances of anti-union violence in the history of the United States occurred, during the Little Steel strike of 1937. The Steel Workers Organizing Committee began an attempt to organize workers at Republic Steel in the spring of 1937, following the unionizing of workers at the country's two largest steel companies US Steel and Jones & Laughlin Steel. In retaliation, Republic Steel expelled over 1000 union supporters at plants in Canton and Massillon. On May 26, the union eventually called for all workers at Republic Steel, Youngstown Sheet and Tube, and Inland Steel (together known as Little Steel) to strike in response to the treatment of workers in Massillon and Canton. On the night of July 11, 1937, a car failed to dim its headlights as it approached a police barricade near a picket line at one of the Massillon plants. City police assumed the worst and without warning opened fire with rifles and shotguns. Police then used this infraction to raid a peaceful crowd that was gathered in front of the union headquarters. Police pumped tear gas canisters and opened fire into the fleeing crowd. Joined by National Guardsmen, the police destroyed the union hall and arrested every suspected unionist they could find. Three men were killed and hundreds were injured during this incident.

Ohio Historical Marker #18-76 was erected in 2004 in front of the Massillon City Hall in memory of the Little Steel Strike of 1937.

Jacob S. Coxey, Sr., sometimes known as General Coxey of Massillon, was an American politician who ran for elective office several times in Ohio. He twice led Coxey's Army, in 1894 and 1914, consisting of a group of unemployed men that he led on marches from Massillon to Washington, D.C., to present a "Petition in Boots" demanding that the Congress allocate funds to create jobs for the unemployed. Although his march failed, Coxey's Army was an early attempt to arouse political interest in an issue that grew in importance until the Social Security Act of 1935 encouraged the establishment of state unemployment insurance programs. Jacob Coxey was elected mayor of Massillon in 1931 and served one year.

Geography
Massillon is at  (40.7967, 81.5214), along the Tuscarawas River. The city's incorporated area primarily resides in the western half of Perry Township, with portions extending north into Jackson Township, west into Tuscarawas Township, and south into Bethlehem Township. The village of Navarre borders the city to the south.

The following residential neighborhoods are located in and around the city:  Amherst Heights, Belmont, C.H.A.R.M, Charity Rotch, Chestnut Hills, Clearview, Colonial Hills, Columbia Heights, East Brookfield, Elms Acres, Greenwood Acres, Kendall Heights, Lawndale, Mayflower Village, Moffitt Heights, New England, Oak Ridge, Perry Heights, Raynell, Sippo Heights, University Village, Walnut Hills, Wellman, West Brookfield, West Park, St. Andrews Golf Estates and Westadaro

Demographics

2010 census
As of the census of 2010, there were 32,149 people, 13,140 households, and 8,268 families residing in the city. The racial makeup of the city was 87.4% White, 8.8% African American, 0.3% Native American, 0.4% Asian, 0.5% from other races, and 2.6% from two or more races. Hispanic or Latino of any race were 2.0% of the population.

There were 13,140 households, of which 29.6% had children under the age of 18 living with them, 42.9% were married couples living together, 14.9% had a female householder with no husband present, 5.1% had a male householder with no wife present, and 37.1% were non-families. 31.1% of all households were made up of individuals, and 13% had someone living alone who was 65 years of age or older. The average household size was 2.37 and the average family size was 2.95.

The median age in the city was 40.1 years. 22.9% of residents were under the age of 18; 8.2% were between the ages of 18 and 24; 24.9% were from 25 to 44; 27.1% were from 45 to 64; and 16.7% were 65 years of age or older. The gender makeup of the city was 48.5% male and 51.5% female.

2000 census
As of the census of 2000, there were 31,325 people, 12,677 households, and 8,328 families residing in the city. The population density was 1,870.3 people per square mile (722.1/km2). There were 13,567 housing units at an average density of 810.0/sq mi (312.7/km2). The racial makeup of the city was 88.18% White, 9.39% African American, 1.60% from two races or more, 0.96% Hispanic or Latino, 0.34% from other races, 0.25% Asian, and 0.23% Native American.

There were 12,677 households, out of which 29.8% had children under the age of 18 living with them, 47.8% were married couples living together, 13.8% had a female householder with no husband present, and 34.3% were non-families. 29.6% of all households were made up of individuals, and 13.6% had someone living alone who was 65 years of age or older. The average household size was 2.40 and the average family size was 2.96.

In the city the population was spread out, with 25.3% under the age of 18, 7.9% from 18 to 24, 28.1% from 25 to 44, 22.5% from 45 to 64, and 16.1% who were 65 years of age or older. The median age was 38 years. For every 100 females, there were 92.6 males. For every 100 females age 18 and over, there were 85.5 males.

The median income for a household in the city was $32,734, and the median income for a family was $41,058. Males had a median income of $32,021 versus $22,327 for females. The per capita income for the city was $17,633. About 8.3% of families and 10.7% of the population were below the poverty line, including 15.5% of those under age 18 and 7.4% of those age 65 or over.

Religion
Massilion is home to St. Mary's Catholic Church. It held the US shrine to St. Dymphna until, on August 4, 2015, a fire broke out in the church, ultimately destroying a baptistery and the shrine. The structure of the building survived, but heavy smoke caused much destruction. After closing for cleaning and restoration, St. Mary's reopened on December 25, 2016.

Economy
While no longer home to the large steel plants of the 20th century, the following businesses are headquartered or otherwise prominent in the city:
 Ameri Cold Logistics  
 Aqua Ohio (incorporated 1926 as the Massillon Water Service Company) 
 A.R.E. 
 Campbell Oil (Headquarters)
 Crown Cork & Seal
 Fresh Mark Inc. (Headquarters)  
 Greif Brothers 
 The Health Plan 
 Heinz Frozen Food Co.
 Massillon Cable TV, founded 1965  
 Midwestern Industries (Headquarters)  
 NFM Welding (Headquarters)  
 People's Cartage 
 Republic Steel 
 R.W. Screw  
 Shearer's Foods (manufacturing and headquarters) 
 Sugardale (pork products)
 Tower Industries
King Machine and Tool Company (Est. 1979)
Massillon has a central business district along Lincoln Way stretching from approximately State Route 21 to Wales Road.  There are a few shopping areas, notably Towne Plaza, Amherst Shopping Center, Mayflower Shopping Center, Massillon Marketplace and Meadows Plaza.

Arts and culture

Museums

The Massillon Museum was established in 1933 in order to preserve the city's rich history. The museum was accredited in 1972 by the American Alliance of Museums and is currently located downtown in the historic Gensemer Brothers Dry Goods building. The museum's collection encompasses approximately 100,000 objects  in 94 categories, 60,000 photographs, and 18,000 archival and reference documents. The Immel Circus is one of the museum's most interesting collections. The 100-square foot miniature circus contains 2,620 pieces: thirty-six elephants, 186 horses, 102 assorted animals, ninety-one wagons, seven tents, and 2,207 people. Most of the pieces were hand-carved by Dr. Robert Immel of Massillon using tools from his dental practice.

Spring Hill Historic Home is the home of Thomas and Charity Rotch, the founders of Kendal, Ohio (the precursor to Massillon). In 1973, the home of the Rotch-Wales families was turned into a historic home and opened to the public. Today, they focus on the Underground Railroad work that Thomas and Charity did while living in the house. The house is a member of the Ohio Friends of Freedom Society, and became a site on the National Park Service's Network to Freedom in 2006. Perhaps one of the most exciting parts of their Underground Railroad history is a letter written by George Duncan, a freedom seeker who was still on the run, to Thomas and Charity. George trusted the Rotches to help reunite him with his companion Edy, who was waiting for safer passage before escaping herself. George's letter is one of only a few written by a formerly enslaved person while they were still on the run.

The Ohio Military Museum is operated by the Ohio Society Of Military History and is home to thousands of artifacts and tributes to the men and women of Ohio who served in the armed forces. The museum moved to the MAPS Air Museum in 2016.

Lions Lincoln Theatre

The 1915 landmark movie theatre, designed by Guy Tilden, was saved from demolition by the local Lions International club in 1982.  The theatre is thought to be one of the oldest purpose-built movie houses in the country still in operation. One of the theatre's two arc-lamp 35mm projectors was replaced by a digital projector in 2013. Today the theatre hosts community events, and screens classic and second-run movies on weekends. The stage also hosts live theatre. In 1989, the play Dear Mother and All, a World War I play based on letters of Massillon native Charles Vernon Brown and his friends and family, debuted at the theatre.

Parks and recreation
The City of Massillon Parks & Recreation Department operates a recreation center, senior center, and 35 parks and open spaces. Massillon's municipal golf course, The Legends of Massillon, opened in 1995. The City maintains the Stark County section of the Sippo Valley Bike & Hike Trail, leading trail users to Dalton in Wayne County.  The Ohio and Erie Canal Towpath Trail also passes through the city.

Football

Football has long been one of the most prominent contributions to the culture of Massillon. In July 2008 Massillon was nominated as one of only twenty cities nationwide as a finalist in ESPN's "Titletown U.S.A." contest. On July 21, a rally was held at Paul Brown Tiger Stadium while ESPN filmed a segment that was aired on SportsCenter. Massillon finished fourth in the voting behind Valdosta, Georgia; Parkersburg, West Virginia; and Green Bay, Wisconsin.

High School football
The name Massillon is most notably associated with the Massillon Washington High School football team, the Tigers. Distinguished Massillon alumni include former Ohio State University, Cleveland Browns, and Cincinnati Bengals coach Paul Brown, and former Ohio State University player and former NFL All-Pro linebacker Chris Spielman. The Tigers are historically one of the winningest high school football teams in the United States, second only to Valdosta High School in Valdosta, Georgia. Along with the Canton McKinley High School Bulldogs, the Tigers represent one half of what many consider to be the greatest high school football rivalry in the nation.  Both Massillon and their fierce rivalry with Canton are subjects of the 2001 documentary film Go Tigers!.

The construction of Paul Brown Tiger Stadium in Massillon was completed in 1939 through the Works Progress Administration program. The stadium currently holds 16,884 people and is named after former Tiger player and head coach Paul Brown. Besides being the regular season home of the Massillon Tiger Football team, the stadium hosts numerous Ohio High School Athletic Association state football playoff games as well as divisional championship games. The stadium also hosts the annual Pro Football Hall of Fame drum and bugle corps competition. The stadium is marked with a historical marker dedicated to Paul Brown and his contribution to the sport 

Massillon's Paul L. David Athletic Training Center was built in 2008 by local philanthropist Jeff David in honor of his late father. The 3 million dollar, 80,000 square foot building is the largest indoor football practice facility in the state of Ohio, 20,000-square-feet larger than the facility used by the NFL's Cleveland Browns.

The Massillon Tigers have accumulated 24 “state AP championships” and 9 “national AP championships” during the school's history. As of 2012, the Tigers have accumulated an overall record of 837-249-35, a record not approached by any other Ohio high school football team. In the years since the Ohio high school playoff system was instituted in 1972, the Tigers have accumulated a current record of 316-117-4. The Tigers have made the playoffs 19 times, the final four six times, and the final championship game three times. There have been 23 professional players, 3 NFL coaches, and 14 collegiate all-Americans that have graduated from Massillon Washington High School.
Washington High School currently holds the record for the most playoff appearances by a high school football team without actually winning a state championship since 1970.

Tiger Swing Band
The 1915 Washington High School annual notes of the Massillon Football Band being a group of students bringing their instruments to the football games and playing to cheer on the team and pep up the fans. The name "The Massillon Tiger Swing Band" and the swing elements were created by George "Red" Bird in 1938 during the Paul Brown era of Massillon football. The band became known as "The Greatest Show in High School Football" and is still a very important part of the Massillon football tradition. The band's swing style includes moving formations and musicians marching with a swing step. Mr. Bird invented the 6 to 5 step. The Tiger Swing band begins every home football game with the traditional hometown songs of "Massillon Will Shine", "Stand Up and Cheer" (to acknowledge the other team), the National Anthem, "Eye of the Tiger" and the "WHS Alma Mater". At the beginning of each half time show, they perform what is known as "Opening Routine", this tradition that goes back for decades and consists of the band's entrance ("Turn Arounds") followed by "Fanfare", "Tiger Rag" and "Carry On". This entire routine is marched at 180 beats per minute. The band also learns and performs a new show for every home game.

Professional football
While the first players known to be paid to play football are believed to have played for club teams in the Pittsburgh, Pennsylvania area, perhaps the first great professional football rivalry was between the Massillon Tigers and Canton Bulldogs from 1903 to 1906 and 1915 to 1919. This rivalry predates both the NFL and the aforementioned rivalry between the Massillon and Canton high schools which continue to use the nicknames of these early professional teams. The Professional Football Researchers Association (PFRA) web site includes articles about the early years of this rivalry, as well as articles about the history of football through the 1970s.

Government
The city is governed by an elected mayor and city council. There are seven council positions representing the city's six wards and three at-large council positions.

Mayor
Kathy Catazaro-Perry (D)

Massillon City Council
President of Council- Claudette Istnick (NP)
Ward 1 - Mark Lombardi (R)
Ward 2 - Aaron J. Violand (R)
Ward 3 - Michael Gregg (R)
Ward 4 - Jill Creamer (D)
Ward 5 - Julie Harwig-Smith (R)
Ward 6 - Michael Snee (R)
At-Large - Ted Herncane (D)
At-Large - Ed Lewis IV (R)
At-Large - Jamie Slutz (R)

The Massillon municipal court system serves all residents in western Stark county located in the cities of Massillon, Canal Fulton and Bethlehem Twp, Jackson Twp., Lawrence Twp., Perry Twp., Sugar Creek Twp., Tuscarawas Twp., Villages of Beach City, Brewster, Hills and Dales, Navarre and Wilmot.

Education

Public schools

The city is served by the following public school districts:
 Massillon City School District
 Jackson Local School District
 Perry Local School District
 Tuslaw Local School District

Additionally, the R.G. Drage Career Technical Center of the Stark County Area Vocational School District is located in Massillon and serves all students in the Massillon/Western Stark County area.

Private schools
There are three private schools located in Massillon. Massillon Christian School, operated by the Massillon Baptist Temple, has students in grades kindergarten through 12. There are also two parochial elementary schools, both of which are affiliated with the Holy Cross Academy system and the Roman Catholic Diocese of Youngstown: St. Barbara School, for grades kindergarten through eight, and St. Mary School, for preschool through eighth grade.

Transportation
Massillon is served by the following state and federal highways:
US Route 30, US Route 62, Ohio State Route 21, Ohio State Route 172, Ohio State Route 241, Ohio State Route 236, and Ohio State Route 93.  Interstate 77 bypasses the city to the east and is accessible via interchanges on US-30, SR-21, SR-241, and SR-172.

Stark Area Regional Transit Authority (SARTA) has a transit center downtown and provides public transit bus service within the city, including service to Canton, the Akron-Canton Regional Airport, and the Amtrak station located in Alliance.

Fidelity US Coach Tours provides charter bus service from the city.

Air

Rail
Amtrak offers daily service on its Capitol Limited to Chicago and Washington, D.C. from a regional passenger station in Alliance, Ohio. Passenger rail service by Penn Central within the city was ended in 1971. Norfolk Southern, Wheeling-Lake Erie, and the R. J. Corman railroads provide freight service in Massillon.

Media
Massillon is part of the Cleveland–Akron–Canton media market. The Independent is the local newspaper serving the city of Massillon and western Stark County. WTIG AM 990 is located in Massillon and serves the local Massillon/Western Stark County area. Massillon Cable TV provides local access television for Massillon as well as portions of Bethlehem, Jackson, Perry, and Tuscarawas townships.

Washington High School has a Media Arts and Communications Career-Technical Education program, WHS-TV. The students are tasked to record most events at the high school including all varsity football games (home and away), all boys varsity home basketball games, produce their own "talk shows" to interview the head football coach, head basketball coach, head baseball coach and head band director and direct, produce and star in their own high school news channel that airs to the student body and on their social media platforms three days a week called Accent.

Notable people

Bill Berry and his family moved to Massillon in 1971
 John Blackburn, wrote the lyrics of "Moonlight in Vermont"
 Mike Brown, owner of Cincinnati Bengals
 Paul Brown, football player and hall of fame coach
 Matt Campbell, head coach of Iowa State Cyclones football team
 David Canary, actor 
 Gareon Conley, NFL cornerback for the Oakland Raiders in 2017
 Jacob S. Coxey, Sr., politician and activist
 Shawn Crable, second-team All-American linebacker and defensive team captain at the University of Michigan; selected in the third round of the 2008 NFL draft by the New England Patriots
 Joseph Davenport, founder of the Massillon Bridge Company, inventor of the locomotive cab and cow catcher
 Jan DeGaetani, mezzo-soprano
 Dillon Dingler – Ohio State catcher, MLB player with the Detroit Tigers.
 Caroline McCullough Everhard, suffragist
 Mayhew Folger, ship captain and uncle of Lucretia Mott
 Bob Fothergill, MLB player who played primarily for the Detroit Tigers
 Lillian Gish, actress
 Rod Graber, player for 1958 Cleveland Indians
 Bobby Grier, first African-American to play in a college football bowl game (the 1956 Sugar Bowl)
 Jessicka Havok, pro wrestler
 Tommy Henrich, MLB player for the New York Yankees, 1937 - 1950
 Mike Hershberger, MLB player for the Chicago White Sox, Kansas City/Oakland Athletics, and the Milwaukee Brewers
 Jim Houston, member of College Football Hall of Fame and Pro Bowl linebacker for the Cleveland Browns
 Lin Houston, an All-American guard who played for Paul Brown in Massillon, at Ohio State and with the Cleveland Browns
 Carlin Isles, a rugby union player and Olympian who plays for the United States national rugby sevens team
 Don James, Hall of fame college football coach
 George V. Kelley, recipient, Medal of Honor
 Bobby Knight, college basketball coach of Indiana's 1976, 1981 and 1987 national champions
 Mark Kozelek, singer/songwriter
 Matt Lanter, actor and model
 James Lawson, civil rights activist 
 Lori Lightfoot, Mayor of Chicago and former President of the Chicago Police Board. 
 Stanley Macomber, inventor of the open-web steel joist
 Kameron Michaels, famous Drag performer
 Ed Molinski, member of College Football Hall of Fame, two-time All-American guard, member of  1938 Tennessee Volunteers National Championship team
 Richard Myers, filmmaker
 Jack Oliver, geophysicist, led team that proved  continental drift theory, or plate tectonics as it was more correctly termed
 Cy Rigler, Major League Baseball umpire in 10 World Series and MLB's first All-Star Game  
 John Ruch, member of the Wisconsin State Assembly
 Robert R. Scott, machinist's mate first class aboard the  posthumously awarded the Medal of Honor for heroism during the Japanese attack on Pearl Harbor.
 Warren Shanabrook, Major League Baseball player
 Devin Smith, wide receiver for the New York Jets of the National Football League and Ohio State University.
 Joe Sparma, pitcher for the Detroit Tigers and quarterback for Ohio State University
 Chris Spielman, 1987 Lombardi Award winner at Ohio State and two-time All-Pro NFL linebacker
 Rick Spielman, general manager of the Minnesota Vikings
 Stalley, rapper
 Harry Stuhldreher, three-time All-American quarterback at Notre Dame, one of the Four Horsemen of Notre Dame
 Patrick Sweany, blues-rock musician
 Jeff Timmons, founder/member of pop group, 98 Degrees
 Ryan Travis, Tuslaw High School graduate signed as an undrafted free agent by the Seattle Seahawks
 Bob Vogel, football player
 John Wager, NFL center
 Tom Weiskopf, professional golfer, winner of 1973 British Open
 Stanfield Wells, Massillon's first All-American football player, selected in 1910
 Alex Wood, college and NFL football coach
 James Young, White House physician to John F. Kennedy and Lyndon B. Johnson

References

External links

 City website
 Massillon WestStark Chamber of Commerce

 
Cities in Ohio
Cities in Stark County, Ohio
Utopian communities in the United States
Populated places established in 1812
French-American culture in Ohio
1812 establishments in Ohio